Dunfermline (Gaelic: Dùn Phàrlain) is a constituency of the Scottish Parliament (Holyrood) covering part of the council area of Fife. It elects one Member of the Scottish Parliament (MSP) by the plurality (first past the post) method of election. It is one of nine constituencies in the Mid Scotland and Fife electoral region, which elects seven additional members, in addition to the nine constituency MSPs, to produce a form of proportional representation for the region as a whole.

Created in 2011, it comprises parts of the former constituencies of Dunfermline East and Dunfermline West.

Bill Walker narrowly won the seat for the Scottish National Party in 2011, however he resigned after being convicted of assault charges in 2013. This led to the 2013 Dunfermline by-election, in which Labour's Cara Hilton was elected, defeating the SNP's Shirley-Anne Somerville. However Somerville subsequently ousted Hilton in the 2016 election and was re-elected in 2021.

Electoral region 

The other eight constituencies of the Mid Scotland and Fife region are Clackmannanshire and Dunblane, Cowdenbeath, Kirkcaldy, Mid Fife and Glenrothes, North East Fife, Perthshire North, Perthshire South and Kinross-shire and Stirling.

The region covers all of the Clackmannanshire council area, all of the Fife council area, all of the Perth and Kinross council area and all of the Stirling council area.

Constituency boundaries and council area 

Fife is represented in the Scottish Parliament by five constituencies, Cowdenbeath, Dunfermline, Kirkcaldy, Mid Fife and Glenrothes and North East Fife.

The Dunfermline constituency is formed from the following electoral wards, all of which are part of Fife:

In full: 
West Fife and Coastal Villages
Dunfermline Central
Dunfermline North
Dunfermline South
In part: 
Rosyth (shared with Cowdenbeath)

Member of the Scottish Parliament

Election results

2020s

2010s

Footnotes

External links

Politics of Dunfermline
Scottish Parliament constituencies and regions from 2011
Politics of Fife
Constituencies of the Scottish Parliament
Constituencies established in 2011
2011 establishments in Scotland
Culross
Kincardine, Fife
Blairhall